Gerard Ross is an American football player.

Gerard Ross may also refer to:

Gerard Ross (musician)

See also
Gerard Ross Norton
Jerry Ross (disambiguation)
Gerald Ross (disambiguation)